Daily prayer in Mandaeism, called brakha  in Mandaic (cognate with Hebrew berakhah and Arabic barakah) or occasionally birukta (birukhta), consists of set prayers that are recited three times per day. Mandaeans stand facing north while reciting daily prayers. Unlike in Islam and Coptic Orthodox Christianity, prostration is not practiced.

Mandaean priests recite rahma prayers three times every day, while laypeople also recite the Rushma (signing prayer) and Asiet Malkia ("Healing of Kings") daily.

Prayer times
The three prayer times in Mandaeism are:

dawn (sunrise) (corresponding to the Fajr prayer in Islam and Shacharit in Judaism; mentioned in Book 8 of the Right Ginza as rahmia ḏ-miṣṭipra)
noontime (the "seventh hour") (corresponding to the Zuhr prayer in Islam and Mincha in Judaism; mentioned in Book 8 of the Right Ginza as rahmia ḏ-šuba šaiia)
evening (sunset) (corresponding to the Maghrib prayer in Islam and Maariv in Judaism; mentioned in Book 8 of the Right Ginza as rahmia ḏ-l-paina)

See also
Barakah
Berakhah
Beracah
Qolasta
Salah
Jewish prayer
Bshuma

References

External links
Brakha and Rishama instructional video
Afternoon brakha and ablution in Amarah, Iraq
Morning brakha
Afternoon brakha
Evening brakha
Baii Rahmi (The Great Prayer)